Frank Leaves for the Orient is an American sitcom produced by Comedy Central, which aired for 6 episodes over mid-1999. The series starred Stan Cahill as Frank, an American preparing to leave for Japan.

Plot
This stream-of-consciousness live-action comedy is a journey through the protagonist Frank's to-do list, as he tries to escape his everyday life by moving to Japan to teach English. Each episode of Frank Leaves For The Orient deals with another aspect of Frank's attempts to wrap up his life, break up with his girlfriend, quit his job, etc. The action becomes a surreal, rapid-fire, sometimes non-linear story that splits apart and then comes back together.

Episodes

Critical reception
New York Daily News reviewer David Bianculli rated the show 3.5 out of 4 stars, writing that the show "has its own energy, its own pace and style, and...a clear and clever continuing plot line". He praised the use of fantasy sequences, musical numbers, and flashbacks.

References

External links
 .

Comedy Central original programming
1999 American television series debuts
1999 American television series endings
1990s American sitcoms